The European Senior Men's Team Championship is a European amateur golf championship for men over 50 (previously 55) organized by the European Golf Association. 

The inaugural event was held in 2006 and the match is played every year.

Before the event was introduced, a Nations Cup was contested as part of the European Senior Men's Championship between 2000 and 2005.

Format
The age limit to enter this competition is above 50 years old. 

The format consists of 20 teams, each of 6 players, competing in two rounds of stroke play, out of which the five lowest scores from each team's six players will count each day. The total addition of the five lowest scores will constitute the team's score and determine which team is qualified for the last three rounds of match play, during which all teams will play a one foursome and four singles match format.

Results

Source:

Winning nations' summary

Source:

See also
European Senior Men's Championship – corresponding individual EGA event
European Senior Ladies' Team Championship – corresponding EGA event for women

References

External links
European Golf Association: Full results

Amateur golf tournaments
Senior golf tournaments
Team golf tournaments
European Golf Association championships
Recurring sporting events established in 2006